The Toyota LR engine is a V10 gasoline engine built by Toyota  and Yamaha.

1LR-GUE

Announced in the Lexus LFA sports car, the 1LR-GUE is a  DOHC 4 valves per cylinder V10 engine, made from aluminium alloy, magnesium alloy and titanium alloy and is smaller than most V8s.

The oil and water pumps are located at the rear of the engine and the lubrication system uses a dry sump. Titanium is used for the valves and the rocker arms have a diamond-like coating. Each cylinder has an independent, electronically controlled throttle body.

Yamaha was contracted to co-develop the 1LR-GUE. The exhaust system was co-developed with Yamaha's music division. The engineers described the sound of the engine as "the roar of an Angel".

The engine redlines at 9000 rpm and has a fuel cut-off at 9500 rpm, with 90% of its peak torque available from 3,700 rpm to 9,000 rpm. An LCD tachometer was fitted to the LFA as an analog fixture allegedly was not responsive enough to the engine's ability to change speed. The Lexus LFA broke the world record in 2012, for the fastest production engine revving to its redline in 0.6 seconds.
It features a single circular dial with a central tachometer with an LCD needle. When engine speed exceeds 9000 rpm, the display area turns red to prime the driver for an up-shift.

Bore × stroke:  × 
Compression ratio: 12.0:1
V angle: 72 degrees
Exhaust emissions certification: Euro 5

Applications:
Lexus LFA

See also

List of Toyota engines

References

LR
V10 engines
Yamaha products